The Passage Islands are a group of four islands in the Falkland Islands of the South Atlantic Ocean.  They lie off Dunnose Head, West Falkland, at the mouth of King George Bay.

Description
The highest point is  Sixtus Hill. Past overgrazing has caused erosion and reduced the cover of tussac. There are several ponds, one of which provides feeding habitat for waders and waterfowl. They were only briefly stocked with cattle in the 1960s and have good tussac coverage.

Important Bird Area
The Passage Islands group has been identified by BirdLife International as an Important Bird Area (IBA).  Birds for which the site is of conservation significance include Falkland steamer ducks, gentoo penguins (300 breeding pairs), southern rockhopper penguins (145 pairs), southern giant petrels, striated caracaras, white-bridled finches, blackish cinclodes and Cobb's wrens.

References

Islands of the Falkland Islands
Important Bird Areas of the Falkland Islands
Seabird colonies
Penguin colonies